Hinderlider v. La Plata River & Cherry Creek Ditch Co., 304 U.S. 92 (1938), is a US Supreme Court case that said a "general common law"  or  "general federal common law"  no longer exists in the  American  legal system and is unconstitutional.   However,  federal courts retain the power to create  federal common law  in specific areas related to federal rights and interests.

Facts
This dispute revolved around diverting water from the La Plata River, a tributary to the Colorado River.

Judgment

Significance
An archetypical example of such federal common law is that relating to disputes between  states  of the United States.  Hinderlider  was the first case to reaffirm the existence of federal common law for other purposes,  specifically here,  the interpretation of an  interstate compact  governing  water rights  between states.

See also
List of United States Supreme Court cases, volume 304

References

External links
 
 

United States Constitution Article Three case law
United States Supreme Court cases
United States Supreme Court cases of the Hughes Court
1938 in United States case law
Federal common law case law
United States water case law
La Plata County, Colorado
Colorado River